Lloyd's Lunchbox is a series of short animations created by Gregory Ecklund for Spike and Mike's Sick and Twisted Festival of Animation. The episodes revolve around the title character Lloyd, a man who appears to be impulsive and mentally ill and who often harms himself. In the first episode, he wears a green shirt with jeans, but in the other three, he appears nude. Almost no dialogue exists, though Lloyd can be heard making noises.

Footage of the episodes was used by Korn in their music video of the song "Right Now".

Episode 1 
The first episode is broken into the days of the week.
 Monday: Lloyd sneezes, causing his lungs to come out of his nose.
 Tuesday: Lloyd attempts to eat a hamburger, but is unable to open his mouth wide enough, and his mouth ends up ripping wide open.
 Wednesday: Instead of brushing his teeth, Lloyd puts the brush through his nose.
 Thursday: Noticing something wrong with his fingernails, Lloyd pulls them off with pliers.
 Friday: A pimple has appeared between Lloyd's eyes, but he squeezes his eyeball, causing the pus to shoot out.
 Saturday: Lloyd gets a pair of scissors and cuts off an eyelid, his lips, and the bottom of his tongue.
 Sunday: Once again Lloyd needs to sneeze, but this time, he covers his mouth. This causes his brain to blast out of the backside of his head.

Episode 2 
Unlike the other episodes, no titles exist between the segments.

This episode consists of Lloyd harming himself further. Here, he defecates out his intestines after eating beans, bites off his finger while trying to eat mucus he took out of his nose, flayed his fingernails while trying to get rid of the dirt underneath them, smashes his teeth with a hammer, and gives himself a paper cut in the final scene, where he finally shows signs of pain. The last scene is intended as situational irony, as Lloyd is seen painless in the other segments.

Episode 3 
Episode 3 is broken into a group of titled segments.
 Adores His Teeth: Lloyd attempts to remove a tooth by attaching it to a string and closing a door. This results in his skull being pulled out, though the tooth does fall out afterwards.
 Reaching for the Stars: Lloyd puts himself in a cannon with the intent of being sent up. At the last second, the cannon's aim lowers, making Lloyd splatter on the ground when shot out.
 Takes One Step Further: Seeing a dead mouse and a nail, Lloyd decides to step on the nail and then the mouse, causing the mouse's innards to go through his foot; his resulting reaction is uneasy.
 Ringing Ears: As Lloyd's phone goes off, Lloyd suspects it's just a ringing in his ears and uses a pencil to clean them. He then realizes it's just his phone and answers it. However, he forgets to remove the pencil, which gets pushed inwards by the phone when he brings it up.
 Zit For A King: Lloyd pops a large zit on his chest and decides to eat the pus, but ends up being disgusted by the taste.

Episode 4 
Episode 4 is titled "How to get pronged", and is much more sexually explicit than the previous episodes. Also unlike previous episodes, it was animated by someone other than Ecklund. Steven Fonti provided the animation while Ecklund provided the story, sound, and character design. It's also the first episode to feature another character besides Lloyd. A nude woman who appears to be just as deranged as he is, as well as dialogue between the characters. The episode is divided into following segments:
 "Lesson One: Clean Yourself Up." Lloyd attempts to get rid of some bugs crawling around his genitals, by first flicking on a lighter under them to lure them up to his belly, and then attempt to stab them with an awl, mostly just managing to puncture his stomach instead.
 "Lesson B: Make Yourself Look Good." Lloyd pours some type of powder into his eye, making it bleed heavily. The woman watching him breaks out in a wide, toothy grin.
 "Third: Find The Right Colonge (sic)." Lloyd farts, and stuffs his index finger up his anus, then smells it, and rubs it over his neck.
 "Lesson 4: Show Her How Special You Are." Lloyd and the woman looks at each other, as Lloyd picks out a rod (the type used for Urethral sounding) and inserts it into his erect penis. He then breaks the rod inside with a hammer, and some blood spurts out. The woman appears to be mildly fascinated.
 "Now She's Yours!" The woman, having observed Lloyd all this time, licks her teeth and exclaims "Lloyd!!" as her nipples extend and a dirty tampon gets pushed out of her vagina. Lloyd is notably distressed as the scene blacks out with him saying "Errr...gotta go."

External links
 

American animated short films